Of all the languages of Russia, Russian, the most widely spoken language, is the only official language at the national level. There are 35 languages which are considered official languages in various regions of Russia, along with Russian. There are over 100 minority languages spoken in Russia today.
From 2020, amendments to the Russian Constitution stipulate that Russian is the language of the "state forming people". With president Vladimir Putin’s signing of an executive order on 3 July 2020 to insert the amendments into the constitution, they took effect on 4 July 2020.

History

Russian lost its status in many of the new republics that arose following the 1991 dissolution of the Soviet Union. In Russia, however, the dominating status of the Russian language continued. Today, 97% of the public school students of Russia receive their education only or mostly in Russian, even though Russia is made up of approximately 80% ethnic Russians.

Russification
On 19 June 2018, the Russian State Duma adopted a bill that made education in all languages but Russian optional, overruling previous laws by ethnic autonomies, and reducing instruction in minority languages to only two hours a week. This bill has been likened by some commentators, such as in Foreign Affairs, to a policy of Russification.

When the bill was still being considered, advocates for the minorities warned that the bill could endanger their languages and traditional cultures. The law came after a lawsuit in the summer of 2017, where a Russian mother claimed that her son had been "materially harmed" by learning the Tatar language, while in a speech Vladimir Putin argued that it was wrong to force someone to learn a language that is not their own. The later "language crackdown" in which autonomous units were forced to stop mandatory hours of native languages was also seen as a move by Putin to "build identity in Russian society".

Protests and petitions against the bill by either civic society, groups of public intellectuals or regional governments came from Tatarstan (with attempts for demonstrations suppressed), Chuvashia, Mari El, North Ossetia, Kabardino-Balkaria, the Karachays, the Kumyks, the Avars, Chechnya, and Ingushetia. Although the "hand-picked" Duma representatives from the Caucasus did not oppose the bill, it prompted a large outcry in the North Caucasus with representatives from the region being accused of cowardice. The law was also seen as possibly destabilizing, threatening ethnic relations and revitalizing the various North Caucasian nationalist movements. The International Circassian Organization called for the law to be rescinded before it came into effect. Twelve of Russia's ethnic autonomies, including five in the Caucasus called for the legislation to be blocked.

On 10 September 2019, Udmurt activist Albert Razin self-immolated in front of the regional government building in Izhevsk as it was considering passing the controversial bill to reduce the status of the Udmurt language. Between 2002 and 2010 the number of Udmurt speakers dwindled from 463,000 to 324,000. Other languages in the Volga region recorded similar declines in the number of speakers; between the 2002 and 2010 censuses the number of Mari speakers declined from 254,000 to 204,000 while Chuvash recorded only 1,042,989 speakers in 2010, a 21.6% drop from 2002. This is attributed to a gradual phasing out of indigenous language teaching both in the cities and rural areas while regional media and governments shift exclusively to Russian.

In the North Caucasus, the law came after a decade in which educational opportunities in the indigenous languages was reduced by more than 50%, due to budget reductions and federal efforts to decrease the role of languages other than Russian. During this period, numerous indigenous languages in the North Caucasus showed significant decreases in their numbers of speakers even though the numbers of the corresponding nationalities increased, leading to fears of language replacement. The numbers of Ossetian, Kumyk and Avar speakers dropped by 43,000, 63,000 and 80,000 respectively. As of 2018, it has been reported that the North Caucasus is nearly devoid of schools that teach in mainly their native languages, with the exception of one school in North Ossetia, and a few in rural regions of Dagestan; this is true even in largely monoethnic Chechnya and Ingushetia. Chechen and Ingush are still used as languages of everyday communication to a greater degree than their North Caucasian neighbours, but sociolinguistics argue that the current situation will lead to their degradation relative to Russian as well.

In 2020, a set of amendments to the Russian constitution was approved by the State Duma and later the Federation Council. One of the amendments is to enshrine Russian as the “language of the state-forming nationality” and the Russian people as the ethnic group that created the nation. The amendment has been met with criticism from Russia's minorities who argue that it goes against the principle that Russia is a multinational state and will only marginalize them further.

Official languages
Although Russian is the only federally official language of Russia, there are several other officially recognized languages within Russia's various constituencies – article 68 of the Constitution of Russia only allows the various republics of Russia to establish official (state) languages other than Russian. This is a list of the languages that are recognized as official (state) in constitutions of the republics of Russia, as well as the number of native speakers according mostly to the 2010 Census or more recent ones:

The Constitution of Dagestan defines "Russian and the languages of the peoples of Dagestan" as the state languages, though no comprehensive list of the languages was given. 14 of these languages (including Russian) are literary written languages; therefore they are commonly considered to be the official languages of Dagestan. These are, besides Russian, the following: Aghul, Avar, Azerbaijani, Chechen, Dargwa, Kumyk, Lak, Lezgian, Nogai, Rutul, Tabasaran, Tat and Tsakhur. All of these, except Russian, Chechen and Nogai, are official only in Dagestan and in no other Russian republic.
In the project of the "Law on the languages of the Republic of Dagestan" 32 languages are listed; however, this law project never came to life. 

Karelia is the only republic of Russia with Russian as the only official language. However, there exists the special law about state support and protection of the Karelian, Vepsian  and Finnish languages in the republic, see next section.

Other recognized languages

The Government of the Republic of Bashkortostan adopted the Law on the Languages of Nations, which is one of the regional laws aimed at protecting and preserving minority languages. The main provisions of the law include General Provisions, Language names of geographic regions. objects and inscriptions, road and other signs, liability for violations of Bashkortostan in the languages of Bashkortostan. In the Republic of Bashkortostan, equality of languages is recognized. Equality of languages is a combination of the rights of peoples and people to preserve and fully develop their native language, freedom of choice and use of the language of communication. The writing of names of geographical objects and the inscription, road and other signs along with the state language of the Republic of Bashkortostan can be done in the languages of Bashkortostan in the territories where they are concentrated. Similar laws were adopted in Mari El, Tatarstan, Udmurtia, Khakassia and the Chukotka Autonomous Okrug.

The federal law "On the languages of the peoples of the Russian Federation"  allows the federal subjects to establish additionally official languages in the areas where minority groups live. The following 15 languages benefit from various degrees of recognition in various regions under this law:
 Buryat in the Agin-Buryat Okrug
 Chukchi in Yakutia
 Dolgan in Yakutia
 Even in Yakutia
 Evenki in Yakutia
 Finnish in Karelia
 Karelian in Karelia
 Kazakh in Altai
 Khanty in the Khanty-Mansi Autonomous Okrug and the Yamalo-Nenets Autonomous Okrug
 Komi-Permyak in the Komi-Permyak Okrug
 Mansi in the Khanty-Mansi Autonomous Okrug
 Nenets in the Khanty-Mansi Autonomous Okrug, the Nenets Autonomous Okrug and the Yamalo-Nenets Autonomous Okrug
 Selkup in the Yamalo-Nenets Autonomous Okrug
 Veps in Karelia
 The Yukaghir languages in Yakutia

Migrant languages
As a result of mass migration to Russia from the former USSR republics (especially from the Caucasus and Central Asia) many non-indigenous languages are spoken by migrant workers. For example, in 2014 2.4 million Uzbek citizens and 1.2 million Tajik citizens entered Russia. 

For comparison, Russian citizens with ethnicities matching these of home countries of migrant workers of are much lower (from 2010 Russian Census, in thousands):

Endangered languages in Russia
There are many endangered languages in Russia. Some are considered to be near extinction and put on the list of endangered languages in Russia, and some may have gone extinct since data was last reported. On the other hand, some languages may survive even with few speakers.

Some languages have doubtful data, like Serbian whose information in the Ethnologue is based on the 1959 census.

Languages near extinction

Most numbers are according to Michael Krauss, 1995. Given the time that has passed, languages with extremely few speakers  might be extinct today. Since 1994, Kerek, Aleut, Medny Aleut, Akkala Sami and Yugh languages have become extinct. 

 Enets (70)
 Ingrian
 Negidal
 Orok (30–82)
 Sami, Ter (2)
 Tofalar (25–30)
 Udege (100)
 Votic (8, 60-non native)
 Ket (20 speakers) (2019)
 Yukaghir, Northern (30–150)
 Yukaghir, Southern (10–50)
 Yupik

Foreign languages 
 
According to the various studies made in 2005-2008 by Levada-Center 15% of Russians know a foreign language. From those who claim knowledge of at least one language:

Knowledge of at least one foreign language is predominant among younger and middle-aged population. Among aged 18–24 38% can read and "translate with a dictionary", 11% can freely read and speak. Among aged 25–39 these numbers are 26% and 4% respectively.

Knowledge of a foreign language varies among social groups. It is most appreciable (15-18%) in big cities with 100,000 and more inhabitants, while in Moscow it rises up to 35%. People with higher education and high economical and social status are most expected to know a foreign language.

The new study by Levada-Center in April 2014 reveals such numbers:

The age and social profiling are the same: knowledge of a foreign language is predominant among the young or middle-aged population with higher education and high social status and who live in big cities.

In the 18th and 19th centuries, French was a common language among upper class Russians. The impetus came from Peter the Great's orientation of Russia towards Europe and accelerated after the French Revolution. After the Russians fought France in the Napoleonic Wars, Russia became less inclined towards French.

In 2015, a survey taken in all federal subjects of Russia showed that 70% of Russians could not speak a foreign language. Almost 30% could speak English, 6% could speak German, 1% could speak French, 1% could speak Spanish, 1% could speak Arabic and 0.5% could speak another language.

English

Languages of education 
Every year the Russian Ministry of Education and Science publishes statistics on the languages used in schools. In 2014/2015 the absolute majority (13.1 million or 96%) of 13.7 million Russian students used Russian as a medium of education. Around 1.6 million or 12% students studied their (non-Russian) native language as a subject. The most studied languages are Tatar, Chechen and Chuvash with 347,000, 253,000 and 107,000 students respectively.

The most studied foreign languages in 2013/2014 were (students in thousands):

See also
Demography of Russia
List of languages of Russia
Languages of the Caucasus
Russian Academy of Sciences, the language regulator in Russia

References

Further reading
 Offord, Derek, Lara Ryazanova-Clarke, Vladislav Rjéoutski, and Gesine Argent. French and Russian in Imperial Russia: Language Use among the Russian Elite. Edinburgh University Press, 2015. Available at JSTOR.

External links

Languages of European Russia (Ethnologue)
Languages of Asian Russia (Ethnologue)
Minority languages of Russia on the Net project, which aims at presenting the languages of Russia to the Web and at facilitating their usage on the Web (most information is in Russian; it provides scientific references on each individual language as well as links to online language descriptions, educational and scientific institutions related to the language, resources on computer-processing of the language and some sites written in this language)
Population by mother tongue and districts in 50 Governorates of the European Russia in 1897
"The History of the French Language in Russia." University of Bristol

 
Language policy in Russia